The wrist is the joint connecting the hand with the forearm.

Wrist may also refer to:
 "Wrist" (Chris Brown song), a 2015 song
 "Wrist" (Logic song), a 2016 single
 Wrist, Germany, a municipality in Schleswig-Holstein